Trinity Hall (formally The College or Hall of the Holy Trinity in the University of Cambridge) is a constituent college of the University of Cambridge.

It is the fifth-oldest surviving college of the university, having been founded in 1350 by William Bateman, Bishop of Norwich, to train clergymen in canon law following decimation of their numbers during the Black Death.

Historically, Trinity Hall taught law; today, it teaches the sciences, arts, and humanities.

Trinity Hall has two sister colleges at the University of Oxford, All Souls and University College.

Notable alumni include theoretical physicists Stephen Hawking and Nobel Prize winner David Thouless, Australian Prime Minister Stanley Bruce, Canadian Governor General David Johnston, philosophers Marshall McLuhan and Galen Strawson, Conservative cabinet minister Geoffrey Howe, Charles Howard, 1st Earl of Nottingham, writer J. B. Priestley, and Academy Award-winning actress Rachel Weisz.

History
The devastation caused by the Black Death in England of the 1340s included the loss of perhaps half of the population; Bishop Bateman himself lost nearly 700 of his parish priests, and so his decision to found a college was probably centred on a need to rebuild the priesthood. The site that Bateman chose was the original site of Gonville Hall, which had been founded three years earlier, but was financially struggling. Bateman's clerical aim for the Hall is reflected in the foundation of 1350, when he stated that the college's aim was "the promotion of divine worship and of canon and civil science and direction of the commonwealth and especially of our church and diocese of Norwich." This led the college to be particularly strong in legal studies, a tradition that has continued over the centuries.

At first all colleges in Cambridge were known as "Halls" or "Houses" and then later changed their names from "Hall" to "College". However, when Henry VIII founded Trinity College next door, it became clear that Trinity Hall would continue being known as a Hall. The new foundation's name may have been a punishment for the college's master, Stephen Gardiner, who had opposed the king's remarriage and had endured much of the college's land being removed. It is incorrect to call it Trinity Hall College, although Trinity Hall college (lower case) is, strictly speaking, accurate. A similar situation had existed once before when Henry VI founded King's College (in 1441) despite the existence of King's Hall (founded in 1317). King's Hall was later incorporated in the foundation of Trinity College in 1546.

Trinity Hall, in addition to having a chapel, also had joint usage of the Church of St John Zacharias with Clare Hall, until the church was demolished to enable the construction of King's College in the 15th century. After this, the college was granted usage of the nearby Church of St Edward, King and Martyr on Peas Hill, a connection which remains to this day.

Allegations of misconduct

In 2019 and 2020, the College experienced unwelcome publicity due to sexual misconduct scandals involving Dr William O’Reilly, the former Acting Senior Tutor, and Dr Peter Hutchinson, a former fellow.

In 2015, 10 students submitted formal complaints of verbal sexual harassment by Hutchinson. Hutchinson was asked to withdraw permanently from further teaching and from attending social events at which students might be present. However, due to an alleged error by the College in 2017, Hutchinson was invited to a college event, which was also open to students. His attendance was in breach of the prior agreement and resulted in an outcry among students and alumni.

Thereafter, in 2019, a formal agreement as to what events Hutchinson could attend was approved by the Governing Body. He remained an Emeritus Fellow of the College. This resulted in further protest from students and alumni as well as more widespread coverage. The Guardian called it "a gross betrayal to (sic)the students" and "a dangerous environment for women students to study".  It was reported in November 2019 that Hutchinson had resigned.

In February 2020, a Tortoise Media investigation alleged that O’Reilly seriously mishandled a disciplinary process involving three women’s experience of sexual assault by a student he had a "close relationship" with. The article said that amongst other things, O’Reilly himself had given witness testimony on behalf of the student at the disciplinary hearings into the assaults. The investigation also claimed that a fourth student had complained to the Master, Jeremy Morris, that they had been sexually assaulted by O’Reilly, an allegation O’Reilly denied. The article reported that Morris allowed O’Reilly to continue teaching un-investigated for a further five months until complaints were investigated by police, during which time he was permitted to continue overseeing the disciplinary process involving the student with whom he was close. Tortoise alleged that as of the date of publication, no formal investigation had been made into this complaint, and no safeguarding measures had been put in place.

In February 2020, Morris and O’Reilly agreed to "step back" from their roles in college pending investigation. In March 2020, the Governing Body authorised an immediate external inquiry into the College’s handling of all allegations raised and matters referred to in the Tortoise article, to be led by Gemma White QC. The independent inquiry recommended Trinity Hall consider disciplinary action against Morris in relation to his handling of one allegation. Morris resigned as Master in August 2021.

In September 2022 the College published White's Report for Publication and a Response Document that indicated the actions it had taken to make improvements to the structures and culture of the institution.

Buildings 

The College site on the Cam was originally obtained from Bateman's purchase of a house from John de Crauden, Prior of Ely, to house the monks during their study, with Front Court being built within the college's first few decades. The medieval structures remain unaltered, but with their façade altered to a more baroque style during the Mastership of Sir Nathaniel Lloyd in 1710-45.

Chapel 

The Chapel was licensed in 1352 and was built by August 1366, when Pope Urban V granted the College permission to celebrate eucharist there. Its present decor stems from its 1729-1730 renovation; Lloyd had pre-existing graves removed to the Ante-Chapel, and the walls decorated with wainscoting and the ceiling with past Masters' crests. The Chapel was extended east in 1864, during which the original piscina was discovered and hidden behind a secret door. The painting behind the communion-table is Maso da San Friano's Salutation, loaned from the Fitzwilliam Museum in 1957, replacing an earlier painting by Stella.

Dining Hall 

The Dining Hall was rebuilt under Lloyd along similar lines to the Chapel, with rendered walls replaced by wainscoting and medieval beams by baroque carvings. A large portrait of Lloyd dominates the wall behind High Table; Lloyd supposedly made it irremovable from its wainscot surroundings, such his representation can never be erased from the College.

Libraries 

The college library was built in the late 16th century, with the permission of Elizabeth I and probably during the mastership of Thomas Preston, and is now principally used for the storage of the college's manuscripts and rare books; it is one of the few remaining chained libraries left in the country. The new Jerwood Library overlooking the river was opened by Lord Howe in 1999, and stores the college's modern book collection.

Other 

The college owns properties in the centre of Cambridge, on Bateman Street and Thompson's Lane, and on its Wychfield site next to Fitzwilliam College, where most of the college's sporting activity takes place. Mary Hockaday was appointed Master in May 2022 and took up the post in September that year.

Student life

Combination Rooms 
Trinity Hall has active Junior, Middle and Senior Combination Rooms for undergraduate, postgraduate and senior members of the college community respectively. The Middle Combination Room is located in Front Court, while the Junior Combination Room is adjacent to the college bar in North Court. Both the MCR and JCR have highly active committees and organize popular socials for their members across the term.

Societies

Trinity Hall Boat Club 
Trinity Hall's oldest and largest society, the Boat Club was founded in 1827, and has had a long and distinguished history; notably from 1890 until 1898, when the college stayed Head of the Mays for 33 consecutive days of rowing, which remains to this day the longest continuous defence by a single club of the bumps headship. The college won all but one of the events in the 1887 Henley Royal Regatta, making it the most successful Cambridge college in Henley's history. The current boathouse, built in 1905 in memory of Henry Latham, is on the River Cam, a short walk from the college.

Trinity Hall Christian Union 

Trinity Hall's Christian Union was founded in 1877, making it the second oldest JCR-listed society. It is part of the broader Cambridge Inter-Collegiate Christian Union.

Hesperides 

Trinity Hall's literary society, the Hesperides, was founded in 1923 by Neil McLeod Innes with the intention of discussing literary and artistic subjects. Named after the seminal work of the 17th-century poet Robert Herrick, in its early years the society hosted T. S. Eliot, J. B. Priestley and Nikolaus Pevsner at its various dinners and functions. Old Hesperideans have gone on to some notoriety, none more so than Donald Maclean, a spy and member of the Cambridge Five. The Hesperides disbanded in 1976, but was re-founded in 2020 to encourage literary activity after the COVID-19 pandemic; speakers have included Trinity Hall alumni Nicholas Hytner and Sophie Winkleman.

Gallery

People associated with Trinity Hall

Masters

On 31 May 2022, Mary Hockaday was announced as the next Master.

Deans

The current Dean is the Revd Dr Stephen Plant. The role of Dean incorporates that of Chaplain in other colleges.

Fellows

Notable alumni 

 Robert McNeill Alexander, CBE, FRS – zoologist 
 Zafar Ansari – Surrey and England cricketer
 Waheed Arian – physician and radiologist, founder of telemedicine charity Arian Teleheal
 Thomas Bilney – Protestant reformer and martyr
 Hans Blix – Former UN Chief Weapons Inspector
 Stanley Bruce – Prime Minister of Australia, 1923–29
 Richard Boyle – rower. Bronze medal in 1908 Olympics
 Edward Carpenter – socialist poet and homosexual activist
 John Cockett – Hockey player. Bronze medal in 1952 Olympics
 William Cooke – Hymn writer
 Archibald Craig – Fencer. Competed in the 1924 and 1948 Olympics
 Felix Creutzig – Physicist and Climate Change Economists
 Don Cupitt – Philosopher of Religion and scholar of Christian theology
 Sir Charles Dilke – Victorian politician
 Laurence Doherty – Tennis player, Olympic gold medalist and Wimbledon Champion
 Reginald Doherty – Tennis player, Olympic gold medalist and Wimbledon Champion
 Lionel Elvin – Educationist
 Ronald Firbank – Novelist
 Billy Fiske – Bobsleigh Olympian and first American fatality of WWII
 Norman Fowler – Politician
 Aubrey de Grey – Anti-ageing theorist
 Frances Harrison – journalist
 Stephen Hawking – Physicist
 Arthur Henderson, Baron Rowley - Labour politician; Secretary of State for Air, 1947–51
 Robert Herrick – poet
 Matthew Holness – Perrier Comedy Award-winning creator of Garth Marenghi
 Andy Hopper – Computer scientist
 Charles Howard, 1st Earl of Nottingham – admiral
 Geoffrey Howe – Former MP and Chancellor of the Exchequer
 Nicholas Hytner – Theatre and film director
 Robin Legge – music critic
 Magnus Linklater – Journalist
 Tom James – Rower, double Olympian and Olympic Gold medallist
 Greville Janner – Former Labour MP and Peer
 David Johnston – The Governor General of Canada
 Harold Kitching – Rower. Bronze medal in 1908 Olympics
 Donald Maclean – Soviet spy
 Andrew Marr – Political journalist and broadcaster
 Adam Mars-Jones – British novelist and critic
 Brett Mason – Australian Senator
 Alfred Maudslay – Archaeologist, explorer, and diplomat
 Alan Nunn May – Physicist and Soviet spy
 Reginald McKenna – Chancellor of the Exchequer during World War I
 Marshall McLuhan – Media theorist
 Sir John Meyrick – Rower. Silver medal in 1948 Olympics
 Peter Millett, Baron Millett – Law Lord
 John Monckton, 1st Viscount Galway – politician
 Khwaja Nazimuddin – Pakistan's second Prime Minister
 Donald Nicholls, Baron Nicholls of Birkenhead – Law Lord
 David Oliver – Geriatrician, President of the British Geriatrics Society
 Tony Palmer – Film screenwriter and director
 Michael Peppiatt – Art historian
 Baron von Pfetten – Professor, Ambassador and Senator
 Emma Pooley – Olympic silver medalist
 Alistair Potts – British World Champion coxswain
 J.B. Priestley – Writer
 William Barnard Rhodes-Moorhouse – First airman to be awarded the Victoria Cross
 Abigail Rokison – Shakespeare academic
 David Sheppard – Bishop and cricketer
 John Silkin – Former Government minister
 Samuel Silkin, Baron Silkin of Dulwich, of North Leigh in the County of Oxfordshire – former MP and Attorney-General
 William Smith – Hockey player. Gold medal in 1920 Olympics
 Tony Slattery – Perrier Comedy Award-winning comedian
 Douglas Stuart – Rower. Bronze medal in 1908 Olympics
 Leslie Stephen – Victorian writer and critic
 Galen Strawson – Philosopher
 Sidney Earnest Swann – Rower, gold medalist in 1912 Olympics
 Sir Cyril Taylor - Businessman and social entrepreneur
 John Taylor – Hockey player. Bronze medal in 1952 Olympics
 John Thomas, Baron Thomas of Cwmgiedd – Lord Chief Justice of England and Wales
 David J. Thouless, theoretical physicist, Nobel Prize and Wolf Prize winner
 Nicholas Tomalin – Journalist and reporter
 Mark Tully – BBC radio broadcaster
 Edmund de Waal – Ceramic artist and author
 Terry Waite – Fellow Commoner of Trinity Hall
 Rachel Weisz – Academy Award-winning actress
 Sophie Winkleman – Actress
 John Wodehouse, 3rd Earl of Kimberley – Polo player, Olympics gold medalist

See also 
 June Event
 Trinity Hall Boat Club

Notes

References

Bibliography
 The Hidden Hall: Portrait of a Cambridge College, Peter Pagnamenta, 
 Trinity Hall: The History of a Cambridge College, 1350-1975, Charles Crawley, 
 Warren's Book (Ed. 1911 by A.W.W.Dale)
 Trinity Hall or, The college of scholars of the Holy Trinity of Norwich, in the University of Cambridge, Henry Elliot Malden. (1902). London: F.E. Robinson.

External links 

 Trinity Hall web page
 Trinity Hall June Event
 Trinity Hall Boat Club

 
1350 establishments in England
Educational institutions established in the 14th century
Colleges of the University of Cambridge
Grade I listed buildings in Cambridge
Grade I listed educational buildings